Corentin Sellier (born 29 May 2001) is a French field hockey player.

Career

Junior national team
Corentin Sellier made his debut for the French U–21 team in 2019 at the EuroHockey Junior Championship in Valencia.

In 2021 he won a bronze medal with the team at the FIH Junior World Cup in Bhubaneswar.

Les Bleus
Sellier made his debut for Les Bleus in 2021 at the EuroHockey Championships in Amsterdam. Later that year he was also named in the French squad for the season three of the FIH Pro League.

References

External links

2001 births
Living people
French male field hockey players
Male field hockey forwards
Place of birth missing (living people)